"Ba'ad Sneen" is a single written by Sameer Nakhla for Amal Hijazi's hit album, Baya al Ward (The Florist). The song was released in 2005 becoming the album's lead-single. It was also one of the most popular music videos of 2005.

Track information

This song is about a young Lebanese girl living in a traditional Arab village, disheartened because her love left her and never returned while she kept on waiting for him. After many years of punishing her heart and waiting for him, she now finds it hard to accept his wish of coming back to her "after years". There are also many flash-backs of the wonderful time Hijazi and her lover had together.

In addition, there are also artistic shorts where Hijazi sits on a stack of hay, looking into the camera, walking along the fields and village-women tending their flock and all other scenes of a village.

References

Amal Hijazi songs
2005 singles
2005 songs